Stewart Mills is an Australian former rugby league footballer who played as a  and  for the Cronulla-Sutherland Sharks in the NRL. He was contracted to the Brisbane Broncos as part of their National Rugby League squad, but not did not feature in the first team.

Playing career
Mills made his NRL debut in round 10 of the 2011 NRL season against the Sydney Roosters, scoring a try in a Cronulla victory. League great Phil Gould described Mills' first game as "one of the toughest and most competent first-grade debuts" he had seen.
Mills' career was hindered by injuries over the past two years before his debut.

On 15 October 2013, Mills signed a one-year contract with the Brisbane Broncos.

In the middle of his contract, Mills quit the Brisbane club to return home and work as an landscaper.

In 2015, Mills joined the Mount Pritchard Mounties in the New South Wales Cup. In late 2016, he revealed on Instagram that he was retiring due to a chronic knee injury, he is now Captain Coach for the Nyngan Tigers 2017.

References

External links
Cronulla Sharks profile
 http://www.dailyliberal.com.au/story/4445571/nyngan-signing-far-from-run-of-the-mill/

1991 births
Australian rugby league players
Cronulla-Sutherland Sharks players
Junior Kangaroos players
Redcliffe Dolphins players
Mount Pritchard Mounties players
Rugby league wingers
Rugby league centres
Rugby league fullbacks
Rugby league players from Sydney
Living people